Juhayna Food Industries is an Egyptian company established in 1983 and began producing dairy, yogurt, and juice in April 1987 with a capital of £E1.3 million. Juhayna Dairy was merged into Juhayna Food Industries in 2004 to become a company specializing in the production of milk, milk products and juices, in addition to its owning of 5 industrial companies, a company for sales and logistics, and a company for agricultural and animal production. Juhayna Food Industries began its activities in January 1996. It manufactures milk and dairy products. Its licensed capital is £E5 billion and the paid-up capital is £E706,053,811 distributed over 706,053,811 shares with a nominal value of £E1 per share. The company was listed on the stock exchange in May 2010 and it is among the main index companies on the EGX 30.

History
The company was established in 1983 by the Egyptian engineer, Safwan Thabet. It signed an agreement with the food packaging company Tetra Pak.

Juhayna established a joint company (Argo Food Industries), thanks to a partnership agreement with the European company, Arla Foods, which specializes in diary products.

Juhayna also signed a cooperation protocol with online payment processing platform Fawry with annual investments of £E15 million.

The company participated in the third session of the Africa Food Processing Fair, and it also participated in the International Food Services Exhibition (Anuga), in Cologne, Germany.

In 2010, Juhayna was exposed to a fire that destroyed much of its factory in Sixth of October City, but the company quickly recuperated the losses and regained its large foothold in the Egyptian market.

Community service 
The company sought to roof 600 homes in Upper Egypt in the village of Shandwil, Sohag.

Affiliates
 The Egyptian Company for Dairy Products
 Modern International Company for Food Industries
 The Egyptian Company for Food Industries (EGFood)
 Al-Marwa Company for Food Industries and Modern Concentrates
 Good Company for Trade and Distribution

References

External links
 official website

Egyptian companies established in 1983
Food and drink companies established in 1983
Food companies of Egypt
Egyptian brands
6th of October (city)
Companies listed on the Egyptian Exchange
Conglomerate companies of Egypt